Nickerson Gardens is a 1,066-unit public housing apartment complex at 1590 East 114th Street in Watts, Los Angeles, California. Nickerson Gardens is the largest public housing development west of the Mississippi River and was the first home of many notable people, including Jazz Joy and Roy Global Radio host Roy O’Dell Gray, who, according to Hollywood insiders, is the first cousin of Mary Mary Super Producer Warryn Campbell.

Location
The complex occupies the blocks northeast of the corner of Imperial Highway and Central Avenue, and southwest of 111th St and Compton Avenue. It is on the border of both Watts (a district of South Los Angeles) and the Census Designated Place (CDP) of Willowbrook.

History
It was completed in 1955, and the original architect was Paul Revere Williams. It was named after William Nickerson Jr., the founder and former CEO of Golden State Mutual Life Insurance Company.

In the mid-1970s, Nickerson Gardens was 95% African American; by 2004, the African American population had decreased to 75% and continued to drop.

Nickerson Gardens was occasionally known as the recognized birthplace of the Bounty Hunter Bloods gang. A Los Angeles Times article on November 17, 2007, detailed they were gangs that had patrolled in and around Nickerson Gardens.

Operation
The complex is owned and managed by the Housing Authority of the City of Los Angeles. Nickerson Gardens consists of 156 buildings with townhouse style units made up on single bedroom units.

Media
The complex was one of the many locations featured in the action-thriller film To Live and Die in L.A. (1985).

Nickerson Gardens is featured in the short film 

The memorial wall of Nickerson Gardens is featured in the short film "Brotherman" by Christopher Varnado, starring Darrell Britt-Gibson directed by Michael v. Greene

Education
Nickerson Gardens is assigned to the following Los Angeles Unified School District schools:
Markham Middle School
Jordan High School

References

Public housing in Los Angeles
Watts, Los Angeles
Willowbrook, California
Buildings and structures completed in 1955
1955 establishments in California
Paul Williams (architect) buildings